Joy Oladokun (born April 6, 1992) is an American singer-songwriter. Oladokun's music spans the genres of folk, R&B, rock, and pop and is influenced by her identity as a queer woman of color. She has released three studio albums: Carry (2016), In Defense of My Own Happiness (The Beginnings) (2020), and In Defense of My Own Happiness  (2021).

Early life 
Oladokun grew up in Casa Grande, Arizona, listening to country and folk music, as well as Bob Marley and Lauryn Hill. Both of her parents are Nigerian immigrants to the United States. Her family regularly attended a Christian church, where Oladokun was chosen to lead worship. Later, Oladokun left the church because it limited her creativity.

When Oladokun was 10, a video of Tracy Chapman inspired her to learn guitar.

After college, at a friend's suggestion, Oladokun moved to Los Angeles to pursue her music career. She later moved to East Nashville, where she signed with Prescription Songs.

Career 
In 2015, Joy Oladokun self-released her debut EP, Cathedrals. Her debut studio album, Carry, was funded by Kickstarter and released on April 29, 2016 through Well Records.

Oladokun released the single "Sunday" in 2019, saying Sunday' is the song that 12-year-old Joy, seated in the back of church youth group, needed to hear. She needed to hear that you can be queer and happy. Queer and healthy. Queer and holy. She needed to see married women kissing and playing with their kids." The music video highlights people in LGBTQ relationships and has a predominantly queer cast.

In 2020, during the Black Lives Matter movement Oladokun released "Who Do I Turn To?", a ballad co-written with Natalie Hemby. Oladokun’s song "Mercy" follows in the same theme, describing her experience as a Black person in the United States, while the single "I See America" criticizes systemic racism. NPR listed "I See America" on its 100 Best Songs of 2020.

On July 17, 2020, Oladokun released her second studio album, In Defense of My Own Happiness (Vol. 1), with White Boy Records. Billboard described the album as a "stunningly emotional collection". Mitch Mosk, editor-in-chief of Atwood Magazine, called it a "a sweeping, soaring, and stunning sophomore record oozing heart and soul."

In 2021, Oladokun received a grant from YouTube's "#YouTubeBlack Voices Fund". The same year she signed with Amigo Records, Verve Forecast Records, and Republic Records. On June 4, 2021 she released her third studio album, In Defense of My Own Happiness.

Discography

Studio albums

Compilation albums

Extended plays

Singles

As lead artist

As featured artist

Music videos

Notes

Accolades

References

External links 
 Official website

African-American women singer-songwriters
American contemporary R&B singers
American women pop singers
American women rock singers
American folk singers
American folk musicians
American people of Nigerian descent
American pop musicians
American rock musicians
American rock songwriters
Contemporary folk musicians
LGBT African Americans
American LGBT singers
Living people
People from Casa Grande, Arizona
Queer musicians
Queer women
Republic Records artists
Verve Forecast Records artists
21st-century African-American people
1992 births
21st-century African-American women
Singer-songwriters from Arizona